Rapel is a Chilean settlement located an hour away from Melipilla in the commune of Navidad on the O'Higgins Region.

During the summer, becomes a balneary. This settlement is near of the Lake Rapel and the Rapel River. In the homonym river was installed the Rapel Dam. The main economic activities in the zone are agriculture, commerce and services.

See also 
 Lake Rapel
 Rapel River
 List of lakes in Chile
 Rapel Dam
 Navidad

References

External links 
 Tourism on the Rapel lake 
 Camping on the Rapel lake 
 Rapel Lake 

Populated places in Melipilla Province